Margherita Carosio (7 June 1908 – 10 January 2005) was an Italian operatic soprano. Her voice is preserved in many Parlophone and Ultraphon recordings made before World War II, as well as a memorable series made for HMV in London, beginning in 1946. She was still singing leading roles in her early sixties and was considered one of the leading bel canto sopranos of her day. She was born and died in Genoa.

Biography

Carosio was born in Genoa, the daughter of a singing teacher and composer, Natale Carosio, who not only supervised her studies but launched her on a career in public concerts at 14. She once said of her father: "Everything I became I owe to him. I used to say to him: 'I am good wool, but you are an extraordinary weaver.'"

She appeared in public at the extraordinarily young age of 14. In 1924, still only 16, she made her operatic debut in the taxing role of Lucia di Lammermoor at the Teatro Cavour in Novi Ligure. In 1928, she was recommended by soprano Margherita Sheridan to the Royal Opera House, Covent Garden, to sing the role of Feodor in Mussorgsky's Boris Godunov, with Feodor Chaliapin. She, like the rest of the company, sang in Italian, while Chaliapin sang in Russian.  The death scene was recorded live and Carosio's clear tones can easily be discerned. Later she said that working with the great Russian basso made her realise what it meant not just to take on a role but to become it. In the same season, she also sang Musetta in La bohème. She would not return to London until after the Second World War.

Carosio was soon singing all over Italy, in demand for roles requiring her light, coloratura voice - notably Amina in Bellini's La sonnambula, Norina in Donizetti's Don Pasquale, and Konstanze in Mozart's Il Seraglio. Oscar in Verdi's Un ballo in maschera was her debut role at La Scala in 1929, followed by an enchanting Philine in Thomas's Mignon. She sang many parts at La Scala, all to great acclaim. Perhaps her particular starring role at this time was Rosina in The Barber of Seville. She also essayed more adventurous repertory, including Zerlina in Auber's Fra Diavolo, the Queen of Shemakhan in Rimsky-Korsakov's The Golden Cockerel, Volkhova in his Sadko and the title role of Stravinsky's The Nightingale. She sang Aminta in the first Italian performances of Richard Strauss's Die schweigsame Frau, and Egloge in the 1935 world-premiere of Mascagni's Nerone (in which she stole all the reviews), both at La Scala, where she continued to appear until 1955.

Returning to London in 1946 London, as a leading star of the visiting San Carlo company of Naples, she sang a peculiarly affecting Violetta in La traviata. She had previously been much admired by the troops who had seen her in this role in Naples. Elegant, pretty, petite and with a gift of charm mixed with pathos, the madonna-faced Carosio portrayed the demi-mondaine as to the manner born. Later still, she appeared with a scratch Italian company in one of her most piquant roles, that of the flighty Adina in Donizetti's L'elisir d'amore, which she had also sung at La Scala and recorded for EMI.

Carosio is most often remembered today as the singer whose indisposition in January 1949 led to Maria Callas learning and singing the role of Elvira in Bellini's I puritani in five days, while she was performing Brünnhilde in Wagner's Die Walküre at Teatro La Fenice in Venice.

Latterly, she was noted in the more lyrical roles of Mimi and Violetta; her purity of tone and ability to convey vulnerability were very appropriate to these parts. As late as 1954, she returned to La Scala to appear in the house premiere of Menotti's Amelia Goes to the Ball, which she also recorded. She had a brief career in Italian films, and even received an offer from MGM in Hollywood, which she turned down because of her many commitments. But she evinced her popular appeal in recordings of songs of the day.

Retirement and death
Carosio retired from the operatic stage in 1959 and for the next 40 years pursued a second career as a journalist and music critic in her hometown, where she died in 2005, aged 96.

References

Bibliography
 The Last Prima Donnas, by Lanfranco Rasponi, Alfred A Knopf, 1982; 
 " Margherita Carosio. La diva che amava i gioielli", by Andrea Lanzola, in "Étude" n° 31, July–August–September 2005 (Association internationale de chant Lyrique TITTA RUFFO. Site: titta-ruffo-international.jimdo.com).

1908 births
2005 deaths
Artists from Genoa
Italian operatic sopranos
Fonotipia Records artists
20th-century Italian women opera singers
Italian women journalists
Italian music critics